Indre Herøy Church is a parish church of the Church of Norway in the municipality of Herøy in Møre og Romsdal county, Norway. It is located in the village of Stokksund on the northeastern shore of the island of Gurskøya. It is the church for the Indre Herøy parish which is part of the Søre Sunnmøre prosti (deanery) in the Diocese of Møre. The white, wooden church was built in a long church style in 1916 by the architect Ole Havnæs, and the building was consecrated on 18 August 1916. The church seats about 375 people.

History
The parish of Herøy was long based at the old Herøy Church on the small island of Herøya. In 1916, however, the parish was divided, and the main church site was moved from the small island to the northwest into the large village of Fosnavåg. At the same time, a new church site was established in Stokksund on Gurskøya to serve the people of that island. This is where the new Indre Herøy Church was built. It was consecrated in 1916. The church was designed by builder Ole Havnæs from the town of Ålesund.

See also
List of churches in Møre

References

Herøy, Møre og Romsdal
Churches in Møre og Romsdal
Long churches in Norway
Wooden churches in Norway
20th-century Church of Norway church buildings
Churches completed in 1916
1916 establishments in Norway